Godin Tepe is an archaeological site in western Iran, located in the valley of Kangavar in Kermanshah Province. Discovered in 1961, the site was excavated from 1965 to 1973 by a Canadian expedition headed by T. Cuyler Young Jr. and sponsored by the Royal Ontario Museum (Toronto, Ontario, Canada). The importance of the site may have been due to its role as a trading outpost in the early Mesopotamian trade networks.

Archaeology
The earliest evidence for occupation at Godin comes from Periods XI through VII, spanning the Early and Middle Chalcolithic. The site was already inhabited as early as c. 5200 BC.

Seh Gabi

Because Godin has such a deep stratigraphy, it was decided that a related site of Seh Gabi nearby should also be studied. Seh Gabi is located 6 km northeast of Godin Tepe in the Kangavar valley. The deeper levels were easier to reach there.

Originally, the excavations at Godin concentrated on levels II (ended c. 500 BC?) to V (c. 3200 BC-3000 BC), but the transition from the Neolithic to Chalcolithic was studied primarily at Seh Gabi.

The earliest pottery found was of the painted pottery traditions, including J ware (Godin pre-XI) related to Halaf culture pottery. The impressed Dalma ware (:de:Dalmā Tepe) (Godin XI/X) is very similar to the pottery traditions from the highlands north of Godin, especially from the area of Lake Urmia.

Level VIII

Level VIII is dated 42004000 BC, contemporary with Terminal Ubaid period. According to Mitchell Rothman, at this time, during the Late Chalcolithic 1 period (LC 1), some substantial trading networks emerged in the area for trade in metals, and in precious or semi-precious stones,

"During the time of Godin VIII, the LC 1, a real increase in the movement of these goods is evident across the region.  For example, lapis lazuli, a semi-precious blue stone known to occur naturally only in the Badakshan area of northeastern Afghanistan, began to appear in LC1 sites in significant amounts (Herman 1968)."

Thus, the importance of Godin Tepe may have been due to its position serving the early trade from the east, from as far as Afghanistan, and to the Mesopotamian flood plain. For example, lapis-lazuli was brought from Badakhshan in Afghanistan to Mesopotamia.

Level VI/V
During the 1973 campaign, level V was excavated through a deep cut from the citadel. It was occupied during the period 32003000 BC. At the end of level V there was a clear gap in the settlement sequence. There were signs of fire, such as room 22 whose roof was burned. The houses were in general well-preserved and contained many artefacts, but objects made of the precious metal were lacking. The archaeological evidence support the idea the settlement was abandoned quickly, but in an orderly manner. Just prior to that, in the final phases of Level VI a large architectural feature dubbed the "Oval Enclosure" was uncovered.

The pottery of level V show influences from the Uruk culture, with parallels at Susa, Uruk (IV) and Nippur The typical Jemdet Nasr tall storage jars, known from Nippur, and the bevelled rim bowls of Uruk are missing however.

Cuyler-Young suggested the existence of Elamite trading posts at the site during this period, established by merchants from Susa.

Thirteen seal impressions and two cylinder seals were found at level V. They were obviously produced locally, as shown by the discovery of an uncarved cylinder. The seal impressions show a parallel with Uruk, Susa and other sites in Khuzestan. They were partly decorated with drill holes. Steatite served as raw material for these, sometimes treated with tempering.

At level V some 43 clay tablets were found of which 27 were preserved in one piece. They contained primarily accounts, like those discovered at temporary Proto-Elamite and Uruk period sites in western Iran and Mesopotamia.

Early wine-making
Traces of wine and beer found in ceramics dated to c. 31002900 BC and along with the findings  at Hajji Firuz Tepe, provide evidence of the early production of those beverages in the Zagros Mountains. Some Kura-Araxes culture potsherds also seem to appear in association with wine making.

Level IV
Level IV (30002650 BC) represents the "invasion" of the northern Yanik-culture (or "Transcaucasian Early Bronze I culture", also known as Kura-Araxes culture), well known from Yanik Tepe, Iran, near Lake Urmia. (Nevertheless, some other Kura-Araxes potsherds were found in yet deeper layers going back to late fourth millennium BC.)

The only notable architectural remains of this period consist of a number of plastered hearths .T.Cuyler Young Jr. defined three main groups of pottery for Level IV. Two of these groups belong to Transcaucasian Early Bronze Age Culture. One of these groups bears two types of coarse ware tempered with coarse grit. One of these types is characterized by a grey-black burnished surface mostly with contrasting colours in the interior and exterior of the vessels. This type of coarse ware was used for producing bowls entirely. Conical bowls decorated with incised and excised designs are common; the incised designs are occasionally  filled with a whitish paste. The second type of coarse ware is lighter in colour, often tan or pinkish buff. The surface of the vessels is either burnished or plain. Besides bowls there are jars with protruding rims and concave or recessed necks.

The second group of Transcaucasian Pottery  found at Godin Tepe was classified as Common Ware. The fabric of this group was tempered by medium-fine grit and was not well-fired. This group of pottery has the same colour range like the coarse ware. The surfaces are highly burnished though the vessels with a light interior and dark exterior are predominant. The forms consist entirely of cups, including the recessed neck types. The decoration is similar in style and technique to the previous coarse wares, but the excised designs are less common.

Level III
Level III (c. 26001500/1400 BC) shows connections with Susa and most of Luristan, and it has been suggested that it belonged to the Elamite confederacy.

 A pottery link to Lagash has been established which may affect the chronology of this layer. Near 1400 BC, Godin Tepe was abandoned and was not re-occupied until c. 750 BC.

Level II

Level II is represented by a single structure, a fortified, mud brick walled architectural complex (133 m x 55 m) occupied by a Mede chief. The columned halls are in the same architectural tradition of the later Persian halls (Pasargadae, Susa, Persepolis), first documented at Hasanlu (V). The Level II pottery (only wheel-made micaceous buff ware) have strong parallels with Iron Age sites as Bābā Jān Tepe(I), Jameh Shuran (IIa), Tepe Nush-i Jan and Pasargadae.

Godin was again abandoned during the 6th century BC, perhaps as a result or in anticipation of the expansion of Cyrus the Great (c. 550 BC) (Brown 1990) or due to the interruption of a social stratification and secondary State formation process after the fall of Assyria.

Level I
A late, Islamic shrine (c. 15th century).

See also
Cities of the Ancient Near East

Notes

References 

 Stuart Brown: "Media in the Achaemenid Period: The Late Iron Age in Central West Iran", in Heleen Sancisi-Weerdenburg & Amelie Kuhrt, Achaemenid History IV: Centre and Periphery (1990), Leinden.
 T. Cuyler Young Jr.: "Godin Tepe", in Encyclopaedia Iranica.
Hilary Gopnik and Mitchell S. Rothman, On the High Road: The History of Godin Tepe, Iran, Mazda Pub, 2011, 
Robert B. Mason and Lisa Cooper, Grog, Petrology, and Early Transcaucasians at Godin Tepe, Iran, vol. 37, pp. 25–31, 1999
Matthews, R. 2013. "The power of writing: an administrative activity at Godin Tepe, Central Zagros, in the late fourth millennium BC", in C. Petrie (ed.), Ancient Iran and its Neighbours: Local Developments and Long-Range Interactions in the 4th Millennium BC, British Institute of Persian Studies, Archaeological Monographs Series, Oxbow Books, Oxford: 337-51
Lesley Frame, Metallurgical investigations at Godin Tepe, Iran, Part I: the metal finds, Journal of Archaeological Science, vol. 37, Iss. 7, Pages 1700–1715, 2010
V. R. Badler, The Dregs of Civilization: 5000 Year-Old Wine and Beer: Residues from Godin Tepe, Iran, Bulletin of the Canadian Society for Mesopotamian, vol 35, pp. 48–56, 2000

External links
 Godin Tepe TSpace Web Archive 
 Beer & Bullets to Go: Ancient 'Takeout' Window Discovered - Live Science

Tells (archaeology)
Populated places established in the 6th millennium BC
Populated places disestablished in the 6th century BC
Populated places disestablished in the 1st millennium BC
1961 archaeological discoveries
Archaeological sites in Iran
Former populated places in Iran
Buildings and structures in Kermanshah Province
Kura-Araxes culture
Halaf culture
Ubaid period
National works of Iran
Uruk period